Banai is an Israeli and Persian surname. It may refer to the following people:

The Banai family of actors and musicians:
Ehud Banai (born 1953), Israeli singer and songwriter
Elisha Banai (born 1988), Israeli singer, musician, songwriter, composer, music producer, and actor
Eviatar Banai (born 1973), Israeli musician, singer and songwriter
Meir Banai (1960-2017), Israeli musician, singer, and songwriter
Orna Banai (born 1966), Israeli actress, comedian, entertainer and past member of the Tel Aviv-Yafo city Council
Yossi Banai (1932-2006), Israeli performer, singer, actor, and dramatist
Yuval Banai (born 1962), Israeli musician 
Ya’akov Banai (1920-2009), Israeli military leader
Hossein Banai, a director of Iran Scouting

See also
 Banai, Bangladesh 
 Banai (goddess), Hindu goddess
 Banai (tribe), a sub-tribe of Koch, India

Hebrew-language surnames
Persian-language surnames